John Hyungseung Chun (born 1970) is an American lawyer from Washington who serves as a United States district judge of the United States District Court for the Western District of Washington. He served as a judge of the Washington State Court of Appeals, Division One from 2018 to 2022.

Early life and education 

The child of South Korean immigrants, Chun was raised in the Pacific Northwest and graduated from the Catlin Gabel School in Portland, Oregon. He received his Bachelor of Arts from Columbia University in 1991 and his Juris Doctor from Cornell Law School in 1994. He served as an associate editor and a note editor on the Cornell Law Review.

Legal career 
Chun served as a law clerk for Judge Eugene A. Wright of the United States Court of Appeals for the Ninth Circuit from 1994 to 1995. He worked at the firm of Mundt MacGregor LLP from 1995 to 2005, becoming a partner in 2002. In 2005, he became a partner at Preston, Gates & Ellis LLP (now K&L Gates), and in 2006, became a Member with the Summit Law Group P.L.L.C. He remained at Summit until 2013, where his practice focused on complex commercial and employment litigation. He also served as a member of the American Arbitration Association's Commercial and Employment panels from 2004 to 2014.

Judicial service

State judicial service 
In December 2013, Chun was appointed by Washington Governor Jay Inslee to serve as a Judge of the King County Superior Court. He took office the following February, and served as a trial judge for civil, criminal, and family law cases until 2018.  

In 2018, Governor Inslee appointed Chun to serve as a Judge on the Washington State Court of Appeals, Division One. He ran unopposed to retain his seat in November 2019. His state court service terminated when he was commissioned as a federal judge.

Federal judicial service 
On September 30, 2021, President Joe Biden announced his intent to nominate Chun to serve as a United States district judge of the United States District Court for the Western District of Washington. President Biden nominated Chun to the seat vacated by Judge James Robart, who assumed  senior status on June 28, 2016. On November 17, 2021, a hearing on his nomination was held before the Senate Judiciary Committee. On December 16, 2021, his nomination was reported out of committee. On January 3, 2022, his nomination was returned to the President under Rule XXXI, Paragraph 6 of the United States Senate; he was later renominated the same day. On January 20, 2022, his nomination was reported out of committee by a 12–10 vote. On March 16, 2022, the United States Senate invoked cloture on his nomination by a 50–45 vote. On March 23, 2022, his nomination was confirmed by a 49–47 vote. He received his judicial commission on March 30, 2022. He was sworn into office by Chief Judge Ricardo S. Martinez on April 11, 2022. Chun is the first Asian American man to serve as a judge of the court.

See also  
List of Asian American jurists

References

External links 
 
 

1970 births
Living people
20th-century American lawyers
21st-century American judges
21st-century American lawyers
American jurists of Korean descent
Columbia College (New York) alumni
Cornell Law School alumni
Judges of the United States District Court for the Western District of Washington
Lawyers from Portland, Oregon
United States district court judges appointed by Joe Biden
Washington (state) state court judges
Washington Court of Appeals judges